The men's 3000 metres steeplechase at the 1988 Summer Olympics in Seoul, South Korea, had an entry list of 33 competitors, with three qualifying heats (33 runners) and two semifinals (26) before the final (13) took place on Friday September 30, 1988.

From the gun Francesco Panetta went out hard, at world record pace the first few laps.  He was marked, a few metres back, by William Van Dijck with the rest of the field strung out behind.  With about three laps to go, Kenyans Julius Kariuki and Peter Koech seemed to jog casually into position next to Van Dijck with Mark Rowland gamely holding on. From behind Alessandro Lambruschini and Patrick Sang rushed to catch up.  With two laps to go, the Kenyan duo broke it open, with Panetta disappearing back into the field.  Rowland was the only one to hang on to the Kenyans, who were looking around for the other challengers.  With the three-man break clear and one lap to go, Kariuki departed from the team tactics and took off, opening up a 10-metre lead around the penultimate turn with Koech chasing.  Kariuki took the water jump carefully; behind him, Koech hurdled the water pit and emphasized his separation on Rowland.  Koech was able to make a little ground on Kariuki, but it was too little too late.  Rowland had 20 metres on Lambruschini for bronze and a new British record.  After the race, Rowland said "I just kept telling myself to dig, dig, dig—and I did it! I've got a bloody medal!"

Medalists

Records
These were the standing World and Olympic records (in minutes) prior to the 1988 Summer Olympics.

The following Olympic record (in minutes) was set during this competition.

Final

Semi-finals

Qualifying heats

See also
 1986 Men's European Championships 3000 m Steeplechase (Stuttgart)
 1987 Men's World Championships 3000 m Steeplechase (Rome)
 1990 Men's European Championships 3000 m Steeplechase (Split)
 1991 Men's World Championships 3000 m Steeplechase (Tokyo)

References

External links
  Official Report

 1
Steeplechase at the Olympics
Men's events at the 1988 Summer Olympics